The 2023 ICC Under-19 Women's T20 World Cup took place in South Africa in January 2023. Sixteen teams took part in the tournament, with their squads listed below. Players aged 18 or younger on 31 August 2022 were eligible for selection.

Australia
Australia's squad was announced on 13 December 2022. Chloe Ainsworth and Jade Allen were ruled out of the tournament after the first round of matches due to injury, and were replaced by Paris Hall and Ananaya Sharma, who were both initially named as non-travelling reserves.

 Chloe Ainsworth
 Jade Allen
 Charis Bekker
 Paris Bowdler
 Maggie Clark
 Sianna Ginger
 Paris Hall
 Lucy Hamilton
 Ella Hayward
 Milly Illingworth
 Eleanor Larosa
 Rhys McKenna (c)
 Claire Moore
 Kate Pelle
 Ananaya Sharma
 Amy Smith
 Ella Wilson

Samira Dimeglio, Sara Kennedy and Olivia Henry were all named as non-travelling reserves.

Bangladesh
Bangladesh's squad was announced in December 2022.

 Afia Humaira Anam Prottasha
 Asrafi Yeasmin Arthy
 Dilara Akter
 Disha Biswas (c)
 Jannatul Maoua
 Leky Chakma
 Marufa Akter
 Misty Rany Saha
 Mst Dipa Khatun
 Mst Eva
 Mst Unnoti Akter
 Rabeya Khan
 Reya Akter Shika
 Shorna Akter
 Sumaiya Akter

Suborna Kormakar, Nishita Akter Nishi, Mst Rabaya Khatun and Juairiya Ferdous were all named as reserves.

England
England's squad was announced on 18 October 2022.

 Ellie Anderson
 Hannah Baker
 Josie Groves
 Liberty Heap
 Niamh Holland
 Ryana MacDonald-Gay
 Emma Marlow
 Charis Pavely
 Davina Perrin
 Lizzie Scott
 Grace Scrivens (c)
 Seren Smale (wk)
 Sophia Smale
 Alexa Stonehouse
 Maddie Ward (wk)

Emily Churms, Charlotte Lambert, Bethan Miles, Jemima Spence and Mary Taylor were all named as non-travelling reserves.

India
India's squad was announced on 5 December 2022.

 Hrishita Basu (wk)
 Parshavi Chopra
 Archana Devi
 Hurley Gala
 Richa Ghosh (wk)
 Mannat Kashyap
 Sonia Mehdiya
 Falak Naz
 Titas Sadhu
 Shweta Sehrawat
 Shabnam Shakil
 Soumya Tiwari
 Gongadi Trisha
 Shafali Verma (c)
 Sonam Yadav

Najla CMC, Shikha Shalot and S Yashashree were all named as standby players.

Indonesia
Indonesia's squad was announced on 3 January 2023.

 Desi Wulandari
 Dewa Ayu Sasrikayoni
 Gusti Ayu Ratna Ulansari
 I Gusti Pratiwi
 Kadek Ayu Kurniartini
 Lie Qiao
 Ni Kadek Ariani
 Ni Kadek Dwi Indriyani
 Ni Kadek Murtiari
 Ni Made Suarniasih
 Ni Putu Cantika
 Sang Ayu Puspita Dewi
 Thersiana Penu Weo
 Wesikaratna Dewi (c)
 Yessny Djahilepang

Ireland
Ireland's squad was announced on 1 December 2022.

 Zara Craig
 Georgina Dempsey
 Rebecca Gough
 Abbi Harrison
 Amy Hunter (c)
 Jennifer Jackson
 Joanna Loughran (wk)
 Niamh MacNulty
 Aimee Maguire
 Kia McCartney
 Ellie McGee
 Julie McNally
 Freya Sargent
 Annabel Squires
 Siúin Woods

Aoife Fisher and Alice Walsh were named as non-travelling reserves.

New Zealand
New Zealand's squad was announced on 13 December 2022. Breearne Illing later withdrew from the squad due to injury, being replaced by Louisa Kotkamp. Fran Jonas was ruled out of the tournament after the first round of matches due to injury, and was replaced by Kate Irwin. Antonia Hamilton was ruled out of the tournament during the Super Six stages due to injury, and was replaced by Emma Irwin.

 Olivia Anderson
 Anna Browning
 Kate Chandler
 Natasha Codyre
 Izzy Gaze (wk)
 Antonia Hamilton 
 Abigail Hotton
 Breearne Illing
 Emma Irwin
 Kate Irwin
 Fran Jonas
 Kayley Knight
 Louisa Kotkamp
 Paige Loggenberg
 Emma McLeod
 Georgia Plimmer
 Izzy Sharp (c)
 Tash Wakelin

Pakistan
Pakistan's squad was announced on 7 December 2022.

 Aliza Khan
 Anosha Nasir
 Areesha Noor
 Eyman Fatima
 Haleema Azeem Dar
 Haniah Ahmer
 Laiba Nasir
 Mahnoor Aftab
 Quratulain Ahsen
 Rida Aslam
 Shawaal Zulfiqar
 Syeda Aroob Shah (c)
 Warda Yousaf
 Zaib-un-Nisa
 Zamina Tahir (wk)

Aqsa Yousaf, Dina Razvi, Maham Anees, Muskan Abid and Tahzeeb Shah were all named as reserves.

Rwanda
Rwanda's squad was announced on 18 December 2022.

 Divine Gihozo Ishimwe
 Gisele Ishimwe (c)
 Henriette Ishimwe
 Zurafat Ishimwe
 Henriette Isimbi
 Cesarie Muragajimana
 Belyse Murekatete
 Sharila Niyomuhoza
 Marie Jose Tumukunde
 Sylvia Usabyimana
 Giovannis Uwase
 Merveille Uwase (wk)
 Cynthia Uwera
 Rosine Uwera

Scotland
Scotland's squad was announced on 12 December 2022. Molly Barbour-Smith later withdrew from the squad due to injury, being replaced by Kirsty McColl.

 Molly Barbour-Smith
 Olivia Bell
 Darcey Carter
 Maryam Faisal
 Katherine Fraser (c)
 Ailsa Lister (wk)
 Maisie Maceira
 Kirsty McColl
 Orla Montgomery
 Niamh Muir
 Molly Paton
 Niamh Robertson-Jack
 Nayma Sheikh
 Anne Sturgess
 Emily Tucker
 Emma Walsingham

South Africa
South Africa's squad was announced on 6 December 2022.

 Jemma Botha
 Jenna Evans
 Ayanda Hlubl
 Elandri Janse van Rensburg
 Madison Landsman
 Monalisa Legodi
 Simone Lourens
 Karabo Meso
 Refilwe Moncho
 Seshnie Naldu
 Nthablseng Nini
 Kayla Reyneke
 Oluhle Siyo (c)
 Mlane Smit
 Anica Swart

Diara Ramlakan and Caitlin Wyngaard were named as non-travelling reserves.

Sri Lanka
Sri Lanka's squad was announced on 5 January 2023.

 Dulanga Dissanayake
 Vishmi Gunaratne (c)
 Manudi Nanayakkara
 Rashmi Nethranjalee
 Sumudu Nisansala
 Harini Perera
 Vidushika Perera
 Umaya Rathnayake
 Dahami Sanethma
 Rishmi Sanjana
 Nethmi Senarathne
 Rashmika Sewwandi
 Vihara Sewwandi
 Pamoda Shaini
 Dewmi Vihanga

United Arab Emirates
The United Arab Emirates' squad was announced on 26 December 2022.

 Samaira Dharnidharka
 Mahika Gaur
 Siya Gokhale
 Geethika Jyothis
 Lavanya Keny
 Vaishnave Mahesh
 Induja Nandakumar
 Rinitha Rajith
 Rishitha Rajith
 Sanjana Ramesh
 Theertha Satish (c)
 Sanchin Singh
 Avni Sunil Patil
 Archana Supriya
 Ishitha Zahra

United States
The United States' squad was announced on 14 December 2022.

 Aditi Chudasama
 Anika Kolan (wk)
 Bhumika Bhadriraju
 Disha Dhingra
 Geetika Kodali (c)
 Isani Vaghela
 Jivana Aras
 Laasya Mullapudi
 Pooja Ganesh (wk)
 Pooja Shah
 Ritu Singh
 Sai Tanmayi Eyyunni
 Snigdha Paul
 Suhani Thadani
 Taranum Chopra

Chetnaa Prasad, Kasturi Vedantham, Lisa Ramjit, Mitali Patwardhan and Tya Gonsalves were all named as reserves.

West Indies
The West Indies' squad was announced on 8 December 2022.

 Asabi Callendar
 Jahzara Claxton
 Naijanni Cumberbatch
 Earnisha Fontaine
 Jannillea Glasgow
 Realanna Grimmond
 Trishan Holder
 Zaida James
 Djenaba Joseph
 KD Jazz Mitchell
 Ashmini Munisar (c)
 Shalini Samaroo
 Shunelle Sawh
 Lena Scott
 Abini St Jean

Zimbabwe
Zimbabwe's squad was named on 29 December 2022.

 Olinda Chare
 Kudzai Chigora
 Betty Mangachena
 Tawananyasha Marumani
 Michelle Mavunga
 Danielle Meikle
 Chipo Moyo
 Natasha Mutomba
 Vimbai Mutungwindu
 Rukudzo Mwakayeni
 Faith Ndhlalambi
 Kelly Ndiraya
 Kelis Ndlovu (c)
 Adel Zimunhu

References

2023